Skourta is a village in Boeotia, Greece.  In 2011 its population was 784. Skourta is part of the municipality Tanagra. It is situated northwest of the Parnitha mountain, in a rather sparsely populated area, dominated by agriculture and forestry. Skourta lies 4 km north of Stefani, 5 km east of Pyli and 30 km northwest of Athens.

Population

See also
List of settlements in Boeotia

External links
 Skourta on GTP Travel Pages

References

Dervenochoria
Populated places in Boeotia